South Creek may refer to:

South Creek (New South Wales), a creek in Australia
South Creek Township, Pennsylvania, United States of America
South Creek Township, South Dakota, United States of America
An archaeological site in Ras Beirut, Lebanon